Odontotermes escherichi, is a small species of termite of the genus Odontotermes. It is native to India, Sri Lanka and Peninsular Malaysia. It attacks many dead, tree stems and decaying logs.

References

External links
Subterranian (sic) termite genus Odontotermes (Blattaria: Isoptera: Termitidae) from Chhattisgarh, India with its annotated checklist and revised key

Termites
Insects described in 1911
Invertebrates of Sri Lanka